Jenny Borlase , also known as Jenny Kennett, is a former Australia netball international. Between 1989 and 1999 she made 70 senior appearances for Australia. She was a member of the Australia teams that won gold medals at the 1991, 1995 and 1999 World Netball Championships, the 1993 World Games and the 1998 Commonwealth Games. At club level, Borlase played for Garville in both the South Australia state league and the Mobil Superleague and for Adelaide Ravens and Melbourne Kestrels in the Commonwealth Bank Trophy league. She also represented South Australia. Borlase was awarded the Medal of the Order of Australia in 1992. After retiring as a player, Borlase has remained involved in netball as both an administrator and coach.

Early life and family
Borlase is originally from the Eyre Peninsula. She is married to Darryl Borlase, a former Australian rules footballer.

Playing career

Early years
In her youth, Borlase, then known as Jenny Kennett played for Eyre Academy. In 1983 she was a member of the Cummins Kapinnie Cougars team that won an A grade premiership in the Great Flinders Football Netball League.

Garville
Borlase played for Garville in both the South Australia state league and the Mobil Superleague. Between 1992 and 1995 she was a member of the Garville teams that won four successive state league grand finals. She also played for Garville in two Mobil Superleague grand finals. In 1993 they finished as champions. Her team mates at Garville included Natalie Avellino and Michelle den Dekker and the team was coached by Patricia Mickan.

South Australia
Borlase also represented South Australia and captained them to a national title.

Commonwealth Bank Trophy
During the early Commonwealth Bank Trophy era, Borlase played for Adelaide Ravens in 1998 and Melbourne Kestrels in 1999.

Australia
Between 1989 and 1999 Borlase made 70 senior appearances for Australia. She made her senior debut on 21 May 1989 against New Zealand. She was a member of the Australia teams that won gold medals at the 1991, 1995 and 1999 World Netball Championships, the 1993 World Games and the 1998 Commonwealth Games. She was also a member the team that won a silver medal at the 1989 World Games.
In 1992 Borlase, along with the rest of the gold medal winning 1991 World Netball Championship squad, were awarded the Medal of the Order of Australia.

Administrator and coach
Administrator
Borlase served on the Netball Victoria board for three years. Between and 2008 and 2016, she served on the Netball South Australia board.
Coach
In 2015 Borlase worked with the Australian Institute of Sport, coaching netball players in the Tall Athlete Program. In 2016 and 2017 she served as a specialist coach with Adelaide Thunderbirds. In 2017 she was appointed head netball coach at the South Australian Sports Institute. In 2019 she was appointed coach of the Seymour College open A team.

Honours
Australia
World Netball Championships
Winners: 1991, 1995, 1999
Commonwealth Games
Winners: 1998
World Games
Winners: 1993
Runners up: 1989
Garville
South Australia State League
Winners: 1992, 1993, 1994, 1995
Runners up: 1990, 1991, 1996
Mobil Superleague
Winners: 1993
Runners up: 1994

Notes
  Australian State Netball League or Australian National Netball Championships.

References

Living people
Year of birth missing (living people)
Australia international netball players
Australian netball players
Netball players from South Australia
Esso/Mobil Superleague players
Garville Netball Club players
Adelaide Ravens players
Melbourne Kestrels players
Commonwealth Games gold medallists for Australia
Commonwealth Games medallists in netball
Netball players at the 1998 Commonwealth Games
Netball players at the 1989 World Games
Netball players at the 1993 World Games
Australian netball administrators
Australian netball coaches
Australian Institute of Sport netball coaches
Adelaide Thunderbirds coaches
South Australian Sports Institute coaches
Recipients of the Medal of the Order of Australia
South Australia state netball league players
1991 World Netball Championships players
1995 World Netball Championships players
1999 World Netball Championships players
Medallists at the 1998 Commonwealth Games